General Thornton may refer to:

Charles Wade Thornton (1764–1854), British Army lieutenant general
Leonard Thornton (1916–1999), New Zealand Army lieutenant general
William Thornton (British Army officer) (1779–1840), British Army lieutenant general

See also
Attorney General Thornton (disambiguation)